The 2001 All-Ireland Senior Camogie Championship—known as the Foras na Gaeilge All-Ireland Senior Camogie Championship for sponsorship reasons—was the high point of the 2001 season. The championship was won by Tipperary who scored defeated their great rivals of the age Cork in a replayed semi-final and Kilkenny by a 16-point margin in the final. The attendance was a then record of 16,354.

Semi-finals
Tipperary needed an injury time equaliser to draw with Cork in the semi-finals at Mullingar. Injury time goals by Eimear McDonnell and Noelle Kennedy gave Cork a somewhat flattering seven-point victory in the replay. Martina Maher scored both goals for Kilkenny against Galway for Kilkenny who qualified for their second final in three years with a relatively inexperienced team, Edel Maher and Aoife Neary were just 16 and goalkeeper Caitriona Ryan only made her championship debut that summer, when star of the team Sinead Millea returned from her world travels. Kilkenny were jointly managed by Brendan Williams and Ted Browne (Angela Downey's husband),

Final
Tipperary took control of the final in a three-minute spell from the ninth to the 12th minute of the first half when first Claire Grogan and then Deirdre Hughes smashed home excellent goals before Hughes scored again with a sparkling point. Kilkenny never recovered from this seven point barrage.

Supermom
Dubbed “supermom” in the media, Kilkenny substitute Jillian Dillon-Maher gave birth to her third child Darragh just seven weeks old before she helped Kilkenny dispatch Galway in the All-Ireland semi-final. She then played in the All Ireland final just two and a half months after giving birth.

Final stages

References

External links
 Camogie Association
 All-Ireland Senior Camogie Championship: Roll of Honour
 County and provincial websites: Antrim Armagh Clare Connacht Cork Derry Down Dublin Galway Kerry Kildare Kilkenny Leinster Limerick London Louth Meath Munster North America Offaly Tipperary Ulster Waterford Wexford Wicklow
 Camogie on facebook
 Camogie on GAA Oral History Project

2001
2001
All-Ireland Senior Camogie Championship